White Rock, Queensland may refer to:
 White Rock, Queensland (Cairns Region)
 White Rock, Queensland (Ipswich)